The 51st Annual Tony Awards was broadcast by CBS from Radio City Music Hall on June 1, 1997. "Launching the Tonys" was telecast on PBS television. The event was hosted by Rosie O'Donnell. The awards ceremony moved away from Broadway for the first time in 30 years. As Radio City Music Hall is much larger than any Broadway theater, this allowed members of the general public to attend the ceremony.

Chicago won six awards, the most of the night, including Best Revival of a Musical. Jonathan Tunick's win for Titanic made him the seventh person to become an EGOT winner.

The ceremony
The opening number: "On Broadway" - Rosie O'Donnell; "Rent" - cast of Rent; "Jellicle Cats" - cast of Cats; "I'm A Woman" - female cast of Smokey Joe's Cafe, "Bring in 'da Noise, Bring in 'da Funk" - cast of Bring in 'da Noise, Bring in 'da Funk; "Greased Lightnin'" - Rosie O'Donnell and cast of Grease; "Be Our Guest" - cast of Beauty and the Beast.

Presenters: Julie Andrews, Lauren Bacall, Alec Baldwin, Christine Baranski, Dixie Carter, Savion Glover, Whoopi Goldberg, Joel Grey, Marilu Henner, Hal Holbrook, Swoosie Kurtz, Liza Minnelli, Mary Tyler Moore, Mandy Patinkin, Bernadette Peters, Chita Rivera, Roseanne Barr, Susan Sarandon, Jimmy Smits, Marisa Tomei, Rip Torn, Leslie Ann Warren, Raquel Welch.

Musicals represented:
 Steel Pier — "Everybody Dance" - Karen Ziemba, Gregory Harrison, Company
 The Life — "My Body" - Sam Harris, Lillias White, Company
 Annie —  "Tomorrow" - Brittny Kissinger
 Candide — "Bon Voyage" - Jim Dale, Company
 Once Upon a Mattress — "Shy" - Sarah Jessica Parker, Company
 Chicago — "All That Jazz"/"Hot Honey Rag" - Bebe Neuwirth, Ann Reinking, Company
 Titanic — "There She Is" - Michael Cerveris, Company

Winners and nominees
Winners are in bold

Special awards
 Regional Theater Tony Award
 Berkeley Repertory Theatre
 Special Tony Award for Lifetime Achievement in the Theatre
 Bernard B. Jacobs (posthumously)

Multiple nominations and awards

These productions had multiple nominations:

12 nominations: The Life
11 nominations: Steel Pier 
8 nominations: Chicago 
5 nominations: Juan Darien and Titanic 
4 nominations: Candide, A Doll's House, Jekyll & Hyde, The Last Night of Ballyhoo and Skylight
3 nominations: The Gin Game, London Assurance, Play On!, Stanley and The Young Man from Atlanta 
2 nominations: The Little Foxes

The following productions received multiple awards.

6 wins: Chicago
5 wins: Titanic
4 wins: A Doll's House 
2 wins: The Life

See also
 Drama Desk Awards
 1997 Laurence Olivier Awards – equivalent awards for West End theatre productions
 Obie Award
 New York Drama Critics' Circle
 Theatre World Award
 Lucille Lortel Awards

References

External links
Official Tony Awards site

Tony Awards ceremonies
1997 in theatre
1997 theatre awards
1997 awards in the United States
1997 in New York City